Trebbin (Polish Trzebin) is a town in the Teltow-Fläming district of Brandenburg, Germany. It is situated on the river Nuthe, 14 km north of Luckenwalde, and 36 km southwest of Berlin (centre).

Demography

Mayor
Since 2003 the mayor is Thomas Berger (CDU). He was re-elected in September 2014.

Twin towns
  Bognor Regis (England, UK)
  Weil am Rhein (Germany)

See also
Grössinsee

References

Localities in Teltow-Fläming
Teltow (region)